Andrea Zanchetta (born 2 February 1975) is a former Italian footballer and current football manager for Inter U18.

Club career

Internazionale
Born in Gaglianico, Piedmont, Zanchetta started his professional career at Internazionale. After working his way through the club's youth ranks, he made his first team debut in the Italian Serie A on 23 October 1994 against U.S. Foggia. That season he played twice for Inter, both against Foggia.

Ahead of the 1995–96 Serie A season, he left for Foggia in a co-ownership deal. Zanchetta proved to me a mainstay in the line-up at his new club, making 57 league appearances in two seasons. After scoring 7 goals in his second season with the club, Inter bought back the full registration rights to Zanchetta and sold him permanently to Chievo shortly after.

Chievo
At Chievo he was one of the regular starter, and scored 8 goals in the first season.

Reggina & Vicenza
After almost relegated to Serie C1, Zanchetta secured a move to Serie A struggler Reggina in co-ownership deal. Zanchetta showed his talent in attack, scored 5 goals in his second Serie A season, in although Reggina was relegated. Co-currently, Chievo won Serie A promotion by finished third and bought back Zanchetta.

He played 2 league matches for Chievo in 2001-02 Serie A season.

In summer 2001, he swapped club with Fabio Firmani, and both club a co-owned the players. He collected 3 goals each in the two season with Vicenza at Serie B.

Chievo Return
In June 2003, Firmani and Zanchetta moved back to their original clubs. With Chievo, which he was awarded a new contract until June 2007 in March 2004 (along with Salvatore Lanna), he failed to become the regular starter but worked as a good backup player, for the team that had Mario Santana, Luciano, Franco Semioli and Victor Obinna in attack. He wore no.10 from 2004 to 2007, toke from Lorenzo D'Anna.

Due to 2006 Italian football scandal, Chievo qualified to 2006–07 UEFA Champions League, he played both legs as attacking midfielder role. He also played in 2006–07 UEFA Cup First Round both legs, as Chievo lost in 2-3 aggregate.

Lecce
In January 2007, he left for Lecce, in exchange with Giuseppe Cozzolino. In the first  seasons he was the regular starter, and won Serie A promotion in 2008, but faced relegation again in 2009.

Cremonese
In July 2009, he was transferred to Cremonese at Lega Pro Prima Divisione.

Personal life
Zanchetta is the father of the footballer Federico Zanchetta.

References

External links
 Profile at Cremonese 
 Inter Archive
 Profile at La Gazzetta dello Sport (2007-08) 
 Profile at Football.it 

Italian footballers
Inter Milan players
Calcio Foggia 1920 players
A.C. ChievoVerona players
Reggina 1914 players
L.R. Vicenza players
U.S. Lecce players
U.S. Cremonese players
Serie A players
Serie B players
Association football midfielders
Sportspeople from the Province of Biella
1975 births
Living people
Footballers from Piedmont